Giuseppe Valenzano (born 15 March 1904, date of death unknown) was an Italian equestrian. He competed in two events at the 1928 Summer Olympics.

References

External links

1904 births
Year of death missing
Italian male equestrians
Olympic equestrians of Italy
Equestrians at the 1928 Summer Olympics
Place of birth missing